The 1931 Catholic University Cardinals football team was an American football team that represented the Catholic University of America as an independent during the 1931 college football season. In its second year under head coach Dutch Bergman, the team compiled an 8–1 record and outscored opponents by a total of 249 to 84. After losing the first game of the season to Boston College, the Cardinals won their final eight games.

Schedule

References

Catholic University
Catholic University Cardinals football seasons
Catholic University Cardinals football